Oh Gyu-min, better known by his in-game name Ohq, is a South Korean professional League of Legends player who was most recently an AD Carry for Snake Esports.

Career

2014 
Oh "Ohq" Gyu-min played for several amateur teams, including Virtual Throne Gaming and Xenics Blast but he didn't make it to OGN until he joined Xenics Storm as their new AD. The team played in HOT6iX Champions Spring 2014 but failed to win a single game and dropped out in the group stages. However, Ohq's play was impressive, and he was given an offer to join NaJin Black Sword. He joined on May 16, 2014, as the new starting AD, replacing Pray. The team played in HOT6iX Champions Summer 2014 where they made it to the quarterfinals but lost 3-2 to SK Telecom T1 S.

2015 
Due to changed OGN rules, Sword and their sister team, NaJin White Shield, were forced to merge, creating NaJin e-mFire. During SBENU Champions Spring 2015, Ohq shared starting time with Shield's former AD, Zefa. NaJin's poor performance in Champions ended with them missing playoffs and taking sixth place overall. NaJin placed fifth in the regular season of SBENU Champions Summer 2015 and qualified for the playoffs but they lost in the first round 2-1 to the KOO Tigers. They earned enough circuit points to make it to the 2015 Season Korea Regional Finals but lost 3-0 in the first round to the Jin Air Green Wings.

NaJin played in the 2015 LoL KeSPA Cup where they lost 2-1 to Rebels Anarchy in the first round. Ohq left NaJin in November to join Team Dragon Knights in the NA CS in January 2016.

2016 
TDK finished 2nd in the NA CS. He joined the NRG Esports of the NA LCS on May 13, 2016, just ahead of the 2016 Summer NA LCS.

NRG finished 7th in the 2016 Summer NA LCS and then lost their relegation match, demoting them to the League of Legends Challenger Series.

NRG terminated off of its LoL players' contracts on August 11, 2016.

Tournament results

Team Dragon Knights 
 2nd — 2016 Spring NA CS

NRG Esports 
 9th — 2016 NA LCS Summer regular season
 Did not qualify — 2017 Spring NA LCS promotion

References 

League of Legends AD Carry players
NaJin e-mFire players
NRG Esports players
Renegades (esports) players
Team Dragon Knights players
Living people
Year of birth missing (living people)
South Korean esports players